ZDM may stand for:

  ZENworks Desktop Management
 Zigong Dinosaur Museum
 Zentralblatt für Didaktik der Mathematik